Will Burrard-Lucas (born 2 September 1983), is a British wildlife photographer and entrepreneur. He is known for developing devices, such as BeetleCam and camera traps, which enable him to capture close-up photographs of wildlife.

Early life and education
Burrard-Lucas was born in the UK and spent part of his childhood living in Tanzania. During this time he became interested in wildlife and nature. He attended Sevenoaks School in Kent before going on to study Physics at Imperial College London.

Career

Burrard-Lucas has been a full-time wildlife photographer since 2010. Previously, he worked for a Big Four accounting firm in London.

Burrard-Lucas works with various conservation NGOs including WWF, African Parks and The Ethiopian Wolf Conservation Programme.

Inventions

In 2009, Burrard-Lucas created BeetleCam, a remote-control camera buggy, and used it to take close-up photographs of elephants, lions and buffalo in Tanzania. In 2011, he returned to Africa to photograph lions in Kenya. He has since used BeetleCam to photograph wildlife in other African countries, including leopards in Zambia and African wild dogs in Zimbabwe. In 2015, Burrard-Lucas used BeetleCam to photograph wildlife at night in Liuwa Plain National Park in Zambia. This series went on to win the Professional Natural World Category in the Sony World Photography Awards.

While living in Zambia in 2012–2013, Burrard-Lucas also developed high-quality camera traps for photographing rare and nocturnal animals. These camera traps were based on a passive infrared sensor and took photos using a standard DSLR or mirrorless camera. In 2015, his work with camera traps led to a collaboration with WWF to photograph elusive animals in Namibia.

In 2014, Burrard-Lucas founded a company, Camtraptions Ltd, which produces BeetleCams and camera trap systems for photographers and filmmakers.

In July 2019, Burrard-Lucas announced his intentions to take two new versions of BeetleCam back to the African continent in search of lions for a new project.

Ethiopian Wolf Project

In 2011, Burrard-Lucas collaborated with Rebecca Jackrel, a nature photographer from the USA, to document endangered Ethiopian wolves in the Bale Mountains of Ethiopia. The project was funded via a successful Kickstarter campaign which raised $13,705. The photographers spent more than a month documenting the lives of the wolves and the work of the Ethiopian Wolf Conservation Programme. The project culminated in a book titled The Ethiopian Wolf: Hope at the Edge of Extinction.

Tsavo Elephants

In August 2017, Burrard-Lucas started working with Tsavo Trust in Kenya to photograph the last "Big Tusker" elephants in Tsavo. During the project, Burrard-Lucas used his BeetleCam to photograph F_MU1, a female elephant with extremely long tusks. The project resulted in a book, titled Land of Giants, which was published in 2019.

Melanistic African Leopard

In February 2019, Burrard-Lucas captured the first high-quality camera trap photographs of a melanistic African leopard, also known as a black panther, in Laikipia Wilderness Camp in Kenya. Previously, only one such leopard had been photographed in Africa, in 1909 in Addis Ababa, Ethiopia. The project resulted in a book, titled The Black Leopard, published in 2021.

Awards 

 1st Place, Living Planet Category, Travel Photographer of the Year, 2021
 1st Place, Animal Portraits Category, Nature Photographer of the Year, 2021
 Highly Commended, Animal Portraits Category, Wildlife Photographer of the Year, 2021
 Grand Title Winner, MontPhoto Awards, 2021
 1st Place, Dusk to Dawn Category, Travel Photographer of the Year, 2019
 1st Place, Animals in their Environment Category, Siena International Photo Awards, 2019
 Highly Commended, GDT European Wildlife Photographer of the Year, 2016, 2017 & 2018
 1st Place, Natural World Category, Professional Competition, Sony World Photography Awards, 2017
 Highly Commended, TIMElapse Award, Wildlife Photographer of the Year, 2014

Publications
 The Ethiopian Wolf: Hope at the Edge of Extinction. 2013. .
 Top Wildlife Sites of the World. 2015. .
 Land of Giants. 2019. .
 The Black Leopard: My Quest to Photograph One of Africa's Most Elusive Big Cats. 2021. .

References

External links
 Burrard-Lucas Wildlife Photography

1983 births
Living people
Photographers from Kent
Nature photographers